Fleury Michon is a French agri-food business quoted at the Bourse de Paris as part of the CAC Small 90.

In June 2015, its products were the second most bought in France for agri-food products, behind Herta and ahead of Président.

References

External links 
 Official website

Companies listed on Euronext Paris